Mount Saint Helena (Wappo: Kanamota, "Human Mountain") is a peak in the Mayacamas Mountains with flanks in Napa, Sonoma, and Lake counties of California. Composed of uplifted 2.4-million-year-old volcanic rocks from the Clear Lake Volcanic Field, it is one of the few mountains in the San Francisco Bay Area to receive any snowfall during the winter.

The mountain has five peaks, arranged in a rough "M" shape. Its highest point, North Peak, is in Sonoma County. The second-tallest, immediately east of the main summit, is the highest point in Napa County. The headwaters of the Napa River arise on the southeast slope of Mount Saint Helena.

History

Mount Saint Helena has had an explosive history of pyroclastic flows that resulted in California's Petrified Forest.

Mount Saint Helena, originally named Kanamota ("Human Mountain") by the Wappo, and later Mount Mayacamas by Spanish colonists, was renamed by a Russian survey party who ascended the peak in 1841. They left a copper plate on the summit inscribed with the date of their visit and the name of Princess Helena de Gagarin, wife of Alexander G. Rotchev, the commanding officer of Fort Ross.

The peak is accessible by hiking trails leading from Robert Louis Stevenson State Park.

Scottish writer Robert Louis Stevenson and his wife Fanny Vandegrift Osbourne spent the summer of 1880 honeymooning in an abandoned mining camp on Mount Saint Helena. Stevenson's book The Silverado Squatters describes his experiences while living there. A state park was named after him near here.

Representation in other media
The mount is described by Ambrose Bierce in his ghost story The Death of Halpin Frayser. Ursula K. Le Guin's novel Always Coming Home is about a post-apocalyptic society that considers Mount Saint Helena sacred.

Views from the summit

See also

 List of summits of the San Francisco Bay Area

References

External links
 
 

Mayacamas Mountains
Mountains of Lake County, California
Mountains of Napa County, California
Mountains of Sonoma County, California
Mountains of the San Francisco Bay Area
Mountains of Northern California